is an HRT terminal station on the Astram Line, located in Hondōri, Naka-ku, Hiroshima. This is the lowest station in the Astram Line (11.4m below sea level).

Platforms

Connections
█ Astram Line
●Hondōri Station — ●Kenchō-mae Station

Other services connections
█ Hiroden Ujina Line
Hiroden Ujina Line Connections at Hiroden Hondōri Station

█ Hiroden Main Line / █ Hiroden Ujina Line
Hiroden Main Line Connections at Hiroden Kamiya-chō-nishi Station
Hiroden Main Line Connections at Hiroden Kamiya-chō-higashi Station

█ Bus Service Routes
Bus Service Route Connections at Hiroshima Bus Center

Around station

Underground
Kamiyachō Shareo

North
Hiroshima Bus Center

South
Hondōri Station (Hiroden)

East
Hiroshima Hondōri Shōtengai (shopping street)

West
Hiroshima Peace Memorial Park
Hiroshima Peace Memorial
Aqua Net Hiroshima (Sightseeing boats)

History
Opened on August 20, 1994.

Notes

See also
Astram Line
Hiroshima Rapid Transit

Astram Line stations
Railway stations in Japan opened in 1994